Ascot High School is a public Catholic secondary school, located in Kingston, Jamaica. The co-educational school was founded by the Society of Jesus in 1997.

The school is one of the top three choices for PEP exams in Jamaica and is widely feasible considered to be a prominent educational facility due to its numerous top placements in academics for the up comings Caribbean Secondary Education Certificate (CSEC) and the Caribbean Advanced Proficiency Examinations (CAPE).

Early beginnings 
Ascot High School was founded in Jamaica in September 1.1997 with 1440 dedicated and hard-working students and one first form students  and a faculty of 40 prominent teachers that will dedicate their life of teaching these ascot students, The new school opened its doors, and the first lessons were given that day in a pavilion and in the newly classrooms that were made to institute these students, It began on the premises of Ascot Basic School but moved to the Middle of both Schools NE 20 Street, Kasauli, Saint Catherine on 1 September 1997. To make room for the growing needs of Ascot High School, it graduated its last class in December 2002, just as twenty-two years had taken in its first students to supply the needs of Ascot Primary School. the former Superior's residence at Kasauli Road, was the property of the Ascot Community before it and the large adjoining field in the middle of both Prominet schools was socialized by the Ascot Community.

In Addition, The Ascotian's bought a Large Property to facilitate the growing of crops and establish the mastery and adeptness of Agricultural Production, in that time the Enrollment was 500 students, but more classroom space was needed. In 2007, the construction of a new building was authorized by the Headmaster/Principal.

On June 13, 2013, Higher Distinguished education will soon be available at the Ascot High School in Portmore, St. Catherine, as ground was broken on June 12 for the construction of its sixth form block. The sixth form programme, which is slated to commence in September 2013, will offer subjects in the Humanities and Science and Technology areas, as well as courses in professional development and leadership training.
Addressing the groundbreaking ceremony, by Lordship and leadership the Minister of Education, Hon. Rev. Ronald Thwaites, noted that the subjects to be offered are significant and ties in with the policy direction of the Ministry. He said “This is quite different from the traditional sixth form and it expresses precisely the policy of the Ministry of Education, which lifts up the academic subjects that are the traditional (ones). You will be offering much more than that at an advanced level, because you will be offering technical and vocational studies and artistic and cultural studies,” the Minister said.

In addition to the future of Ascot and to the Education of it, the new building was erected. The leadership of the Science Block has laboratories and classrooms for Physics, Chemistry, and Biology. Its construction, supervised by the former Principal/headmaster Cedric Murray, was finished in December 2013 and opened for use in January 2014. The formal dedication and opening took place on 24 February 2014, when it was blessed by Hon. Rev. Ronald Thwaites, JOV, Jamaica, Ministry of Education

Becoming a government school 
Ascot High School is built to become a grant-in-aid school in 1997, and it became a part of the Government's educational system. The Jamaican Government would provide the salaries of the teaching faculty and staff. This new status, however, forced the Ascot Community to give up some control of the school to the Ministry of Education. In 1956, the Ministry of Education established a Common Entrance Examination, ending the college's own entrance examination and selection of its students. The Grade Six Achievement Test (GSAT) was initiated in 1998, further regularizing the entrance of students.

Discipline has always been a strong element of Ascot High School, to maintain discipline but also to encourage a spirit of competition. To this end, The student body was divided into three "houses": Tulip, Hibiscus, and Marigold, named after the school Pride and colors.:  These five houses became rivals for leadership in studies, sports, and discipline, Sportsmanship.

Recent development 
The School has continued to excel in innovation and leadership and The 1st Jamaica Zen-Do-Kai-Kan/Ascot High School Karate team and Compete against some of the best in the country and the world and Ascot Wonderful girls rugby team scored 20 to nil against Cedar Grove Academy on January 28, 2020.

Motto 
The school's motto is in opus victoriae, translated as "Working for success".

Activities, sports, service 
The school attends 45 clubs and societies and 15 different sports, including participation in all national sports competitions. A service project is required each term from each of the clubs, besides the following specifically service-oriented groups: Interact Club (branch of Rotary International), High Key (Branch of Key Club), Drama Club, Tourism Club (Branch of Tourism Board), Entrepreneurship Club, Robotics Club, Cadet Unit Club, Tourism Action Club, Ministry Outreach Group (visits indigent elderly), and "more"

References

External links
Official school website

Schools in Jamaica
Educational institutions established in 1997
Buildings and structures in Saint Catherine Parish
1997 establishments in Jamaica